Anastasia Nabokina (born 14 February 1971) is a Russian ballerina.

Biography 
Nabokina was born on 14 February 1971 in Moscow, Russia. In 1981 she entered the Moscow State Academy of Choreography. At the age of 17, she made her stage debut in a school production as Lise of La fille mal gardée in the Bolshoi Theatre, Moscow. After completing her studies in 1990, she was actively involved in the establishment of the Kremlin Ballet Theatre, as Principal dancer. She worked with Ekaterina Maximova, Vladimir Vasiliev and Nina Timofeeva.

In 1996, she moved to Warsaw, where she became the leading ballerina with the Teatr Wielki, Polish National Opera. At the Teatr Wielki, she appeared as Odette-Odile in Irek Mukhamedov's version of Swan Lake. She also worked with Natalia Makarova in her production of La Bayadère and Mats Ek in his Carmen and A sort of.... Nabokina frequently merges classical dancing techniques with dynamics of contemporary dance.

Personal life 
Anastasia is married to Polish photographer Tomasz Jaworski. They have one son, Jeremi.

References

External links 
 
 biography from the Polish National Opera website

Russian ballerinas
1971 births
Living people